The Primetime Emmy Award for Outstanding Fantasy/Sci-Fi Costumes is presented as part of the Primetime Emmy Awards. In 2015, categories for period/fantasy and contemporary costumes were created. The categories were divided in 2018 for period and fantasy/sci-fi costumes. They replaced the retired categories for Outstanding Costumes for a Miniseries, Movie, or Special and Outstanding Costumes for a Series.

Rules require that nominations are distributed proportionally among regular series and limited series/movies, based on the number of submissions of each. For instance, if two-fifths of submissions are limited series/movies then two of the five nominees will be limited series/movies.

Winners and nominations

2010s

2020s

Designers with multiple awards
This total includes nominations for Outstanding Costumes for a Series.

6 awards
 Michele Clapton

4 awards
 Alexander Fordham

3 awards
 Robert Blackman
 Kate O'Farrell 
 Emma O'Loughlin

2 awards
 Chloe Aubry
 Lou Eyrich
 Sheena Wichary

Programs with multiple awards
This total includes wins for Outstanding Costumes for a Series.
5 wins
 Game of Thrones

3 wins
 Star Trek: The Next Generation

Designers with multiple nominations
This total includes nominations for Outstanding Costumes for a Series and Primetime Emmy Award for Outstanding Costumes for a Miniseries, Movie, or Special.

11 nominations
 Robert Blackman

9 nominations
 Michele Clapton

6 nominations
 Jean-Pierre Dorleac
 Alexander Fordham

5 nominations
 Lou Eyrich

4 nominations
 Charles Knode

3 nominations
 Chloe Aubry
 Natalie Bronfman
 Eduardo Castro
 Ane Crabtree
 Judy Evans
 Jo Kissack Folsom 
 Grady Hunt
 Meghan Kasperlik
 Carol Kunz
 Monique McRae
 Kate O'Farrell 
 Emma O'Loughlin
 Julie Robar
 Sheena Wichary

2 nominations
 Charlene Amateau 
 Giovanni Casalnuovo
 Kelsey Chobotar 
 Sharen Davis
 Terry Dresbach
 Joanna Eatwell
 Al Lehman
 Warden Neil
 Phoebe Parsons
 Anna Mary Scott Robbins
 Cynthia Summers
 Kathryn Tart
 William Ware Theiss
 Shawna Trpcic
 Clare Vyse
 Michael Weldon
 Robert Worley

Programs with multiple nominations
This total includes nominations for Outstanding Costumes for a Series.

8 nominations
 Game of Thrones

6 nominations
 Star Trek: The Next Generation

5 nominations
 The Handmaid's Tale

4 nominations
 Quantum Leap
 Star Trek: Voyager

3 nominations
 Beauty and the Beast
 Once Upon a Time
 Westworld

2 nominations
 Amazing Stories
 Buck Rogers in the 25th Century
 Fantasy Island
 The Mandalorian
 Pushing Daisies
 A Series of Unfortunate Events
 Star Trek: Deep Space Nine
 Tales from the Crypt
 3rd Rock from the Sun

References

Outstanding Fantasy Sci-Fi Costumes